Nina Manucharyan (17 February 1885 - 3 September 1972) was an Armenian film actress.

Filmography
 Namus (1925)
 Shor and Shorshor (1926)
 The Slave (1927)
 Zare (1927)
 Evil Spirit (1927)
 The Power of Evil (1928)
 Anush (1931)
 Harut (1933)
 Pepo (1935)

References

External links

1885 births
1972 deaths
Armenian film actresses
Armenian silent film actresses
20th-century Armenian actresses